The Big Lie (Spanish:La gran mentira) is a 1956 Spanish film directed by Rafael Gil and starring Francisco Rabal, Madeleine Fischer and Jacqueline Pierreux.

Synopsis 
César Neira, a declining actor, sees his chance to succeed again thanks to the inclusion in his film of a paralyzed teacher who has become very popular thanks to a radio contest.

Cast
 Francisco Rabal as César Neira  
 Madeleine Fischer as Teresa Camps 
 Jacqueline Pierreux as Sara Millán  
 Manolo Morán  as Representante de César 
 Emilio Alonso 
 Julio F. Alymán  as Maquillador  
 Rafaela Aparicio  as Vecina de La Molina  
 Rafael Bardem as Tío de Teresa 
 Gustavo Biosca  
 Irene Caba Alba as Vecina de La Molina  
 Rafael Calvo Revilla  as Doctor  
 José Calvo  as Productor que habla con censor  
 Pedro Chicote  
 Carlos Ciscar 
 Rafael Cortés  
 Bobby Deglané  
 Teresa del Río 
 Juan Domenech as Paulino Sándalo  
 Ángel de Echenique 
 Ramón Elías as Manolo Rodríguez 
 Fernando Fernán Gómez  
 José Ramón Giner  as Guionista pesado  
 Julio Goróstegui  as Dueño del cine  
 Rufino Inglés  
 Ángel Jordán  as Raúl Estrada  
 Milagros Leal  as Vecina de La Molina  
 Sergio Mendizábal  
 Jorge Mistral  
 Antonio Ozores  
 José Luis Ozores  
 Erasmo Pascual  
 Francisco Puyol  
 Antonio Ramallets  
 Luis Rivera  
 José Samitier  
 Pilar Sanclemente  
 Juan Segarra  
 Carlos Miguel Solá  as Apuntador  
 José Luis Sáenz de Heredia  
 Francisco Sánchez as Productor catalán en la fiesta  
 José Tamayo 
 Ángela Tamayo  
 José Villasante  
 Álvarez Álvarez 
 Ángel Álvarez  as Guionista de Sándalo  
 Vicente Ávila

References

Bibliography
 de España, Rafael. Directory of Spanish and Portuguese film-makers and films. Greenwood Press, 1994.

External links 

1956 films
Spanish romantic drama films
1950s Spanish-language films
Films directed by Rafael Gil
1950s Spanish films
1956 romantic drama films
Spanish black-and-white films